The 2017 Upper Austria Ladies Linz was a women's tennis tournament played on indoor hard courts. It was the 31st edition of the Generali Ladies Linz, and part of the WTA International tournaments-category of the 2017 WTA Tour. It was held at the TipsArena Linz in Linz, Austria, on 9–15 October 2017.

Points and prize money

Point distribution

Prize money

1 Qualifiers prize money is also the Round of 32 prize money
* per team

Singles entrants

Seeds 

 Rankings as of October 2, 2017

Other entrants 
The following players received wildcards into the singles main draw:
  Belinda Bencic
  Anna-Lena Friedsam
  Barbara Haas

The following players received entry from the qualifying draw:
  Mihaela Buzărnescu
  Jana Fett
  Viktória Kužmová
  Viktoriya Tomova

The following player received entry as a lucky loser:
  Naomi Broady

Withdrawals 
Before the tournament
  Mona Barthel → replaced by  Denisa Allertová
  Dominika Cibulková → replaced by  Viktorija Golubic
  Océane Dodin → replaced by  Alison Van Uytvanck
  Camila Giorgi → replaced by  Naomi Broady
  Jeļena Ostapenko → replaced by  Madison Brengle
  Lucie Šafářová → replaced by  Jana Čepelová
  Markéta Vondroušová → replaced by  Ons Jabeur

Retirements 
  Monica Niculescu

Doubles entrants

Seeds 

1 Rankings as of October 2, 2017

Other entrants 
The following pairs received wildcards into the doubles main draw:
  Belinda Bencic /  Barbara Haas
  Nicola Geuer /  Anna Zaja

Champions

Singles 

  Barbora Strýcová def.  Magdaléna Rybáriková, 6–4, 6–1

Doubles 

  Kiki Bertens /  Johanna Larsson def.  Natela Dzalamidze /  Xenia Knoll, 3–6, 6–3, [10–4]

External links 
 

Upper Austria Ladies Linz
2017
Generali Ladies Linz
Upper Austria Ladies
Generali